Rock Hudson (born Roy Harold Scherer Jr.; November 17, 1925 – October 2, 1985) was an American actor. One of the most popular movie stars of his time, he had a screen career spanning more than three decades. A prominent heartthrob in the Golden Age of Hollywood, he achieved stardom with his role in Magnificent Obsession (1954), followed by All That Heaven Allows (1955), and Giant (1956), for which he received a nomination for the Academy Award for Best Actor. Hudson also found continued success with a string of romantic comedies co-starring Doris Day: Pillow Talk (1959), Lover Come Back (1961), and Send Me No Flowers (1964). During the late 1960s, his films included Seconds (1966), Tobruk (1967), and Ice Station Zebra (1968).  Unhappy with the film scripts he was offered, Hudson turned to television and was a hit, starring in the popular mystery series McMillan & Wife (1971–1977). His last role was as a guest star on the fifth season (1984–1985) of the primetime ABC soap opera Dynasty, until an AIDS-related illness made it impossible for him to continue.

Although discreet regarding his sexual orientation, it was known among Hudson's colleagues in the film industry that he was gay. In 1984, Hudson was diagnosed with AIDS. The following year, he became one of the first celebrities to disclose his AIDS diagnosis. Hudson was the first major celebrity to die from an AIDS-related illness, on October 2, 1985, at age 59.

Early life
Hudson was born Roy Harold Scherer Jr. on November 17, 1925, in Winnetka, Illinois, the only child of Katherine (née Wood), a homemaker and later telephone operator, and Roy Harold Scherer Sr., an auto mechanic. His father was of German and Swiss descent, while his mother had English and Irish ancestry. He was raised as a Roman Catholic. During the Great Depression, Hudson's father lost his job and abandoned the family. Hudson's parents divorced when he was four years old; a few years later, in 1932, his mother married Wallace Fitzgerald, a former Marine Corps officer whom young Roy despised. Roy was adopted by Fitzgerald without his consent, and his legal name then became Roy Harold Fitzgerald. The marriage eventually ended in a bitter divorce and produced no children.

Hudson attended New Trier High School in Winnetka. At some point during his teenage years, he worked as an usher in a movie theater and developed an interest in acting. He tried out for a number of school plays, but failed to win any roles because he could not remember his lines, a problem that continued to occur through his early acting career.

He graduated from high school in 1943, and the following year enlisted in the United States Navy during World War II. After training at the Great Lakes Naval Training Station, he departed San Francisco aboard the troop transport SS Lew Wallace with orders to report to Aviation Repair and Overhaul Unit 2, then located on Samar, Philippines, as an aircraft mechanic. In 1946, he returned to San Francisco aboard an aircraft carrier, and was discharged the same year.

Hudson then moved to Los Angeles to live with his biological father (who had remarried) and to pursue an acting career. Initially he worked at odd jobs, including as a truck driver. He applied to the University of Southern California's dramatics program, but was rejected due to poor grades. After he sent talent scout Henry Willson a picture of himself in 1947, Willson took him on as a client and changed the young actor's name to Rock Hudson; later in life, Hudson admitted that he hated the name. The name was coined by combining the Rock of Gibraltar and the Hudson River. Hudson later named his independent film production company Gibraltar Productions. Politically, Hudson was a conservative Republican; he campaigned and voted for Barry Goldwater in the 1964 United States presidential election.

Career
Hudson made his acting debut with a small part in the Warner Bros. film Fighter Squadron (1948); according to a 21st-century source, it took 38 takes for Hudson to successfully deliver his only line in the film.

Universal-International
Hudson was signed to a long-term contract by Universal-International. There he received coaching in acting, singing, dancing, fencing, and horseback riding, and began to be featured in film magazines where, being photogenic, he was promoted.

His first film at Universal was Undertow (1949), which gave him his first screen credit. He had small parts in Peggy (1950), Winchester '73 (1950) as an American Indian, The Desert Hawk (1950) (as an Arab), Tomahawk (1951), and Air Cadet (1951).

Hudson was billed third in The Fat Man (1951), but back down the cast list for Bright Victory (1951). He had good parts as a boxer in Iron Man (1951) and as a gambler in Bend of the River (1952). He supported the Nelson family in Here Come the Nelsons (1951).

Leading man
Hudson was promoted to leading man for Scarlet Angel (1952), opposite Yvonne De Carlo, who had been in Desert Hawk and Tomahawk. He co-starred with Piper Laurie in Has Anybody Seen My Gal? (1952), the first of his films directed by Douglas Sirk.

In Horizons West (1952) Hudson supported Robert Ryan, but he was star again for The Lawless Breed (1953) and Seminole (1953). In 1953, he appeared in a Camel commercial that showed him on the set of Seminole.

He and De Carlo were borrowed by RKO for Sea Devils (1953), an adventure set during the Napoleonic Wars. Back at Universal he played Harun al-Rashid in The Golden Blade (1953). There was Gun Fury (1953) and Back to God's Country (1953). Hudson had the title role in Taza, Son of Cochise (1954), directed by Sirk and produced by Ross Hunter.

Magnificent Obsession and stardom
Hudson was by now firmly established as a leading man in adventure films. What turned him into a star was the romantic drama Magnificent Obsession (1954), co-starring Jane Wyman, produced by Hunter and directed by Sirk. The film received positive reviews, with Modern Screen Magazine citing Hudson as the most popular actor of the year. It made over $5 million at the box office.

Hudson returned to adventure films with Bengal Brigade (1954), set during the Indian Mutiny, and Captain Lightfoot (1955), produced by Hunter and directed by Sirk. In 1954, exhibitors voted Hudson the 17th most popular star in the country.

Hunter used him in the melodramas One Desire (1955) and All That Heaven Allows (1955), which reunited him with Sirk and Wyman. He next acted in Never Say Goodbye (1956).

Giant (1956)
Hudson's popularity soared with George Stevens' film Giant (1956). Hudson and his co-star James Dean were nominated for Oscars in the Best Actor category. Another hit was Written on the Wind (1957), directed by Sirk and produced by Albert Zugsmith. Sirk also directed Hudson in Battle Hymn (1957), produced by Hudson, playing Dean Hess. These films propelled Hudson to be voted the most popular actor in American cinemas in 1957. He stayed in the "top ten" until 1964.

Hudson was borrowed by MGM to appear in Richard Brooks' Something of Value (1957), a box-office disappointment. So too was his next film, a remake of A Farewell to Arms (1957). To make A Farewell to Arms, he reportedly turned down Marlon Brando's role in Sayonara, William Holden's role in The Bridge on the River Kwai, and Charlton Heston's role in Ben-Hur. A Farewell to Arms received negative reviews, failed at the box office and became the last production by David O. Selznick. Hudson was reunited with the producer, director and two stars of Written on the Wind in The Tarnished Angels (1958), at Universal. He then made Twilight for the Gods (1958) and This Earth Is Mine (1959).

Romantic comedy star

Ross Hunter teamed Hudson with Doris Day in the romantic comedy Pillow Talk (1959), which was a massive hit. Hudson was voted the most popular star in the country for 1959 and was the second most popular for the next three years.

Less popular was The Last Sunset (1961), co-starring Kirk Douglas. Hudson then made two hugely popular comedies: Come September (1961) with Gina Lollobrigida, Sandra Dee and Bobby Darin, directed by Robert Mulligan; and Lover Come Back (1961) with Day.

He made two dramas: The Spiral Road (1962), directed by Mulligan, and A Gathering of Eagles (1963), directed by Delbert Mann. Hudson still was voted the third most popular star in 1963. Hudson went back to comedy for Man's Favorite Sport? (1964), directed by Howard Hawks and the popular Send Me No Flowers (1964), his third and final film with Day. Along with Cary Grant, Hudson was regarded as one of the best-dressed male stars in Hollywood and received Top 10 Stars of the Year a record-setting eight times from 1957 to 1964.

Decline as a star
Strange Bedfellows (1965), with Gina Lollobrigida, was a box-office disappointment. So too was A Very Special Favor (1965), despite having the same writer and director as Pillow Talk.

Hudson next appeared in Blindfold (1966). Then, working outside his usual range, he starred in the science-fiction thriller Seconds (1966), directed by John Frankenheimer and co-produced through his own film production company Gibraltar Productions. The film may have been Hudson's best performance.

He also tried his hand in the action genre with Tobruk (1967), directed by Arthur Hiller. After the comedy A Fine Pair (1968) with Claudia Cardinale, he starred in the action thriller Ice Station Zebra (1968) at MGM, a role which remained his personal favorite. The film was a hit but struggled to recoup its large cost.

Hudson dabbled in westerns, appearing opposite John Wayne in The Undefeated (1969). Playing a World War I flier, he co-starred opposite Julie Andrews in the Blake Edwards musical Darling Lili (1970), notorious for its huge cost.

Television
During the 1970s and 1980s, he starred in a number of TV movies and series. His most successful television series was McMillan & Wife opposite Susan Saint James, which ran from 1971 to 1977. Hudson played police commissioner Stewart "Mac" McMillan, with Saint James as his wife Sally, and their on-screen chemistry helped make the show a hit.

During the series, Rock Hudson appeared in Showdown (1973), a western with Dean Martin, and Embryo (1976), a science-fiction film. Hudson took a risk and surprised many by making a successful foray into live theater late in his career, and the best received of his efforts was I Do! I Do! in 1974.

After McMillan ended, Hudson made the disaster movie Avalanche (1978) and the miniseries Wheels (1978) and The Martian Chronicles (1980). He was one of several stars in The Mirror Crack'd (reuniting him with Giant co-star Elizabeth Taylor) (1980) and co-starred in The Beatrice Arthur Special (1980).

Later years

In the early 1980s, following years of heavy drinking and smoking, Hudson began having health problems which resulted in a heart attack in November 1981. Emergency quintuple heart bypass surgery sidelined Hudson and his new TV show The Devlin Connection for a year, and the show was canceled in December 1982 soon after it aired. His health issues forced him to turn down the role of Col. Sam Trautman in First Blood.

Hudson recovered from the heart surgery but continued to smoke. He nevertheless continued to work with appearances in several TV movies such as World War III (1982). He was in ill health while filming the action-drama film The Ambassador in Israel during the winter months from late 1983 to early 1984. He reportedly did not get along with his co-star Robert Mitchum, who had a serious drinking problem and often clashed off-camera with Hudson and other cast and crew members.

From December 1984 to April 1985, Hudson appeared in a recurring role on the prime time soap opera Dynasty as Daniel Reece, a wealthy horse breeder and a potential love interest for Krystle Carrington (played by Linda Evans), as well as the biological father of the character Sammy Jo Carrington (Heather Locklear). While Hudson had long been known to have difficulty memorizing lines, which resulted in his use of cue cards, his speech began to visibly deteriorate on Dynasty. He was slated to appear for the duration of the show's second half of its fifth season; however, because of his progressing ill health, his character was abruptly written out of the show and died off-screen.

Personal life
While his career developed, Hudson and his agent Henry Willson kept the actor's personal life out of the headlines. In 1955, Confidential magazine threatened to publish an exposé about Hudson's secret homosexuality. Willson stalled this by disclosing information about two of his other clients. Willson provided information about Rory Calhoun's years in prison and the arrest of Tab Hunter at a party in 1950. According to some colleagues, Hudson's homosexual activity was well known in Hollywood throughout his career, and former co-stars Julie Andrews, Mia Farrow, Elizabeth Taylor, and Susan Saint James claimed that they knew of his homosexuality and kept Hudson's secret for him, as did friends Audrey Hepburn and Carol Burnett.

Soon after the Confidential incident, Hudson married Willson's secretary Phyllis Gates. Gates later wrote that she dated Hudson for several months, lived with him for two months before his surprise marriage proposal, and married Hudson out of love and not (as it was reported later) to prevent an exposé of Hudson's sexual past. Press coverage of the wedding quoted Hudson as saying: "When I count my blessings, my marriage tops the list." Gates filed for divorce after three years in April 1958, citing mental cruelty. Hudson did not contest the divorce and Gates received alimony of $250 per week for 10 years. Gates never remarried.

According to the biography Rock Hudson: His Story (1986) by Hudson and Sara Davidson, Hudson was good friends with novelist Armistead Maupin, who states that the two had a brief fling. The book also names certain of Hudson's lovers, including Jack Coates; Tom Clark (who published the memoir Rock Hudson: Friend of Mine); actor and stockbroker Lee Garlington; and Marc Christian (born Marc Christian MacGinnis), who later won a suit against the Hudson estate.

In 2005, Bob Hofler published a biography of Hudson's agent Henry Willson, titled The Man Who Invented Rock Hudson. He told The Village Voice that Phyllis Gates attempted to blackmail Hudson about his homosexual activities. The LGBT news magazine The Advocate published an article by Hofler, who claimed that Gates was actually a lesbian who believed from the beginning of their relationship that Hudson was gay.

An urban legend states that Hudson married Jim Nabors in the early 1970s. Not only was same-sex marriage not recognized under the laws of any American state at the time, but, at least publicly, Hudson and Nabors were nothing more than friends. According to Hudson, the legend originated with a group of "middle-aged homosexuals who live in Huntington Beach" who sent out joke invitations for their annual get-together. One year, the group invited its members to witness "the marriage of Rock Hudson and Jim Nabors", at which Hudson would take the surname of Nabors' character Gomer Pyle, becoming Rock Pyle.

The joke was in the mainstream by this time. In the October 1972 edition of MAD magazine (issue no. 154), an article titled "When Watching Television, You Can be Sure of Seeing...", gossip columnist 'Rona Boring' states: "And there isn't a grain of truth to the vicious rumor that movie and TV star Rock Heman and singer Jim Nelly were secretly married! Rock and Jim are just good buddies! I repeat, they are not married! They are not even going steady!" Those who failed to get the joke spread the rumor, and as a result, Hudson and Nabors (then still not open) never spoke to each other again.

Although he was raised Roman Catholic, Hudson later identified as an atheist. A week before Hudson died, his publicist Tom Clark asked a priest to visit. Hudson made a confession, received communion, and was administered last rites. Hudson also was visited by Shirley and Pat Boone.

Illness and death

Unknown to the public, Hudson was diagnosed with HIV on June 5, 1984, three years after the emergence of the first cluster of symptomatic patients in the US, and only one year after the initial conclusion by scientists that HIV causes AIDS. Over the next several months, Hudson kept his illness a secret and continued to work while, at the same time, traveling to France and other countries seeking a cure, or at least treatment to slow the progression of the disease.

On July 16, 1985, Hudson joined his old friend Doris Day for a Hollywood press conference announcing the launch of her new TV cable show Doris Day's Best Friends in which Hudson was videotaped visiting Day's ranch in Carmel, California, a few days earlier. He appeared gaunt and during the segment Hudson did very little speaking, with most of it consisting of Day and Hudson walking around as Day's recording of "My Buddy" played in the background, with Hudson noting he had quickly tired out. His appearance was enough of a shock that the reunion was broadcast repeatedly over national news shows that night and for days to come. Media outlets speculated on Hudson's health. Day later acknowledged: "He was very sick. But I just brushed that off and I came out and put my arms around him and said 'Am I glad to see you.'"

Two days later, Hudson traveled to Paris, France, for another round of treatment. After Hudson collapsed in his room at the Ritz Hotel in Paris on July 21, his publicist Dale Olson released a statement claiming that Hudson had inoperable liver cancer. Olson denied reports that Hudson had AIDS and only said that he was undergoing tests for "everything" at the American Hospital of Paris. Four days later on July 25, 1985, Hudson's French publicist Yanou Collart confirmed that Hudson did, in fact, have AIDS. He was among the earliest mainstream celebrities to have been diagnosed with the disease.

Hudson flew back to Los Angeles on July 30. He was so weak that he was removed by stretcher from the Air France Boeing 747 he had chartered, on which he and his medical attendants were the only passengers. He was flown by helicopter to UCLA Medical Center, where he spent nearly a month undergoing further treatment. He was released from the hospital in late August 1985 and returned to his home in Beverly Hills, Los Angeles for private hospice care.

At around 9:00 a.m. on October 2, 1985, Hudson died in his sleep from AIDS-related complications at his home in Beverly Hills at the age of 59, less than seven weeks before what would have been his 60th birthday. Hudson requested that no funeral be held. His body was cremated hours after his death and a cenotaph later was established at Forest Lawn Cemetery in Cathedral City, California. His ashes were scattered in the channel between Wilmington, Los Angeles and Santa Catalina Island.

The disclosure of Hudson's AIDS diagnosis provoked widespread public discussion of his homosexuality. In Logical Family: A Memoir, gay author Armistead Maupin, who was a friend of Hudson, writes that he was the first person to confirm to the press that Hudson was gay in 1985. Maupin explains that he confirmed it to Randy Shilts of the San Francisco Chronicle and that he was annoyed that producer Ross Hunter, who was also gay, denied it. In its August 15, 1985 issue, People magazine published a story that discussed his disease in the context of his sexuality. The largely sympathetic article featured comments from show business colleagues such as Angie Dickinson, Robert Stack, and Mamie Van Doren, who claimed they knew about Hudson's homosexuality and expressed their support for him. At that time, People had a circulation of more than 2.8 million, and, as a result of this and other stories, Hudson's homosexuality became public. Hudson's revelation had an immediate impact on the visibility of AIDS and on the funding of medical research related to the disease.

Shortly after Hudson's press release disclosing his infection, William M. Hoffman, the author of As Is, a play about AIDS that appeared on Broadway in 1985, stated: "If Rock Hudson can have it, nice people can have it. It's just a disease, not a moral affliction." At the same time, Joan Rivers was quoted as saying: "Two years ago, when I hosted a benefit for AIDS, I couldn't get one major star to turn out. Rock's admission is a horrendous way to bring AIDS to the attention of the American public, but by doing so, Rock, in his life, has helped millions in the process. What Rock has done takes true courage." Morgan Fairchild said that "Rock Hudson's death gave AIDS a face." In a telegram Hudson sent to a September 1985 Hollywood AIDS benefit, Commitment to Life, which he was too ill to attend in person, Hudson said: "I am not happy that I am sick. I am not happy that I have AIDS. But if that is helping others, I can at least know that my own misfortune has had some positive worth."

Shortly after his death, People reported: "Since Hudson made his announcement, more than $1.8 million in private contributions (more than double the amount collected in 1984) has been raised to support AIDS research and to care for AIDS victims (5,523 reported in 1985 alone). A few days after Hudson died, Congress set aside $221 million to develop a cure for AIDS." Organizers of the Hollywood AIDS benefit Commitment to Life reported that it was necessary to move the event to a larger venue to accommodate the increased attendance following Hudson's announcement that he was suffering from the disease. Shortly before his death Hudson made the first direct contribution, $250,000, to amfAR, The Foundation for AIDS Research, helping launch the non-profit organization dedicated to AIDS/HIV research and prevention; it was formed by a merger of a Los Angeles organization founded by Dr. Michael S. Gottlieb, Hudson's physician, and Elizabeth Taylor, his friend and onetime co-star, and a New York-based group.

However, Hudson's revelation did not immediately dispel the stigma of AIDS. Although then-president Ronald Reagan and his wife Nancy were friends of Hudson, Reagan made no public statement concerning Hudson's condition. However, Reagan did in fact phone Hudson privately in his Paris hospital room where he was being treated in July 1985 and released a condolence statement after his death.

After Hudson revealed his diagnosis, a controversy arose concerning his participation in a scene in the television drama Dynasty in which he shared a long and repeated kiss with actress Linda Evans in one episode (first aired in February 1985). When filming the scene, Hudson was aware that he had AIDS, but did not inform Evans. Some felt that he should have disclosed his condition to her beforehand. At the time, it was incorrectly thought that the virus was present in low quantities in saliva and tears, but there had been no reported cases of transmission by kissing. Nevertheless, the Centers for Disease Control and Prevention had warned against exchanging saliva with members of groups perceived to be at high risk for AIDS.

According to comments given in August 1985 by Ed Asner, then president of the Screen Actors Guild, Hudson's revelation caused incipient "panic" within the film and television industry. Asner said that he was aware of scripts being rewritten to eliminate kissing scenes. Later in the same year, the guild issued rules requiring that actors be notified in advance of any "open-mouth" kissing scenes, and provided that they could refuse to participate in such scenes without penalty. Linda Evans appears not to have been angry at Hudson, and asked to introduce the segment of the 1985 Commitment to Life benefit that was dedicated to Hudson.

Legacy

For his contribution to the motion picture industry, Hudson was given a star on the Hollywood Walk of Fame (located at 6116 Hollywood Blvd). Following his death, Elizabeth Taylor, his co-star in the film Giant, purchased a bronze plaque for Hudson on the West Hollywood Memorial Walk. In 2002, a Golden Palm Star on the Palm Springs Walk of Stars was dedicated to him.

Lawsuits
Following Hudson's death, Marc Christian, Hudson's former lover, sued his estate on grounds of "intentional infliction of emotional distress".

Christian claimed Hudson continued having sex with him until February 1985, more than eight months after Hudson knew that he had HIV. Although he repeatedly tested negative for HIV, Christian claimed that he suffered from "severe emotional distress" after learning from a July 25, 1985 newscast that Hudson had been diagnosed with AIDS. Christian also sued Hudson's personal secretary Mark Miller for $10 million because Miller allegedly lied to him about Hudson's illness. In 1989, a jury awarded Christian $21.75 million in damages, later reduced to $5.5 million. Christian later defended Hudson's reputation in not telling him he was infected: "You can't dismiss a man's whole life with a single act. This thing about AIDS was totally out of character for him", he stated in an interview.

In 1990, Hudson's live-in publicist Tom Clark and publicist Dick Kleiner published Rock Hudson, Friend of Mine. In the book, Clark said he believed Hudson acquired HIV from blood transfusions during quintuple bypass open-heart surgery in 1981; never acknowledged that their relationship went beyond being roommates; and characterized Christian as disreputable. Christian filed a $22 million libel suit against the authors and publisher, charging that he had been labelled "a criminal, a thief, an unclean person, a blackmailer, a psychotic, an extortionist, a forger, a perjurer, a liar, a whore, an arsonist and a squatter".

In 2010, Robert Park Mills, the attorney who represented the Hudson estate against Christian in court, released a book titled Between Rock and a Hard Place: In Defense of Rock Hudson. In the book, Mills discusses details of the trial and also questions Christian's allegations against Hudson.

Filmography

Film

Television

Awards

In popular culture
Hudson was parodied as actor Rock Quarry in The Flintstones episode "The Rock Quarry Story" (1961).

Hudson has been the subject of three plays: Rock (2008), starring Michael Xavier as Hudson, For Roy (2010), starring Richard Henzel as Hudson, and Hollywood Valhalla (2011), starring Patrick Byrnes as Hudson.

The story of Hudson's marriage was depicted in the 1990 TV film Rock Hudson, starring Daphne Ashbrook as Gates and Thomas Ian Griffith as Hudson.

Hudson is portrayed by Jake Picking in the 2020 miniseries Hollywood, a revisionist tale of post-World War II Hollywood.

Hudson's inability to get his only line right in Winchester '73 – "Would that it were so simple" is parodied in Hail, Caesar! by the Coen Brothers.

British band Big Audio Dynamite's debut album, This Is Big Audio Dynamite, contains a song about the AIDS crisis titled "Stone Thames." The phrase was derived from "Rock Hudson" by replacing "Rock" with "Stone," and "Hudson" (also the name of a river) with "Thames."

See also
 Rock Hudson's Home Movies

References

Bibliography

External links

 
 
 Transcript of CNN Larry King, 7 June 2001, Special on Rock Hudson offscreen with Dale Olson
 Transcript of CNN Larry King,  1 October 2003, 18th anniversary of Hudson's death
 FBI Records: The Vault – Rock Hudson at vault.fbi.gov
 Image of Rock Hudson, Gene Roddenberry, and Roger Vadim posing with women cast members for motion picture "Pretty Maids All in a Row," California, 1970. Los Angeles Times Photographic Archive (Collection 1429). UCLA Library Special Collections, Charles E. Young Research Library, University of California, Los Angeles.

1925 births
1985 deaths
20th-century American male actors
AIDS-related deaths in California
American adoptees
American atheists
American male film actors
American male television actors
Burials at Forest Lawn Cemetery (Cathedral City)
American gay actors
LGBT people from Illinois
Male actors from Illinois
New Trier High School alumni
People from Studio City, Los Angeles
People from Winnetka, Illinois
United States Navy personnel of World War II
United States Navy sailors
Universal Pictures contract players
20th-century American LGBT people
Burials at sea